Benndorf is municipality in the Mansfeld-Südharz district.

Benndorf may also refer to:

 in Saxony-Anhalt, Germany:
 Benndorf (Kabelsketal), district of Kabelsketal, Saalekreis district
 Benndorf (Lanitz-Hassel-Tal), district of Lanitz-Hassel-Tal, Burgenlandkreis district
 Benndorf (Braunsbedra), the brown coal mining disappeared district of Braunsbedra, Saalekreis district
 Benndorf, Bendorf, lost place between Laucha and Weischütz, Burgenlandkreis district
 in Saxony, Germany:
 Benndorf (Delitzsch), district of Delitzsch, Landkreis Nordsachsen district
 Benndorf (Frohburg), district of Frohburg, Landkreis Leipzig district

Benndorf is the family name of several people.
 a noble family "von Benndorf"
 Cornelie Benndorf-Much (1880–1962), Austrian anglistin, gymnastics teacher and high school director 
 Hans Benndorf (1870–1953), Austrian physicist
 Helene Benndorf (1897–1984), German librarian
 Karl-Heinz Benndorf (1919–1995), German painter and sculptor 
 Michael Benndorf (born 1952), President of the Higher Administrative Court of Saxony-Anhalt in Magdeburg
 Otto Benndorf (1838–1907), German archaeologist
 Paul Benndorf (1859–1926), German teacher and writer
 Wolfgang Benndorf (1901–1959), Austrian director of the university library Graz

See also 
 Bendorf, Beendorf
 Behnsdorf, Bensdorf